Aaltje Noordewier–Reddingius (born Aaltje Reddingius; 1 September 1868, Deurne – 6 April 1949, Hilversum) was a noted Dutch classical soprano who had an active performance career in the concert repertoire from 1888 through the 1930s. She was also a celebrated voice teacher.

From 1886 to 1890, she studied at the Conservatorium van Amsterdam. In 1893, she married painter Michiel Noordewier. She was a mentor to singers such as Aafje Heynis, Erna Spoorenberg and Laurens Bogtman.

Legacy 
Main-belt asteroid 677 Aaltje, discovered by August Kopff at Heidelberg Observatory in 1909, was named in her honour.

See also 
 Erna Spoorenberg

References 
 

1868 births
1949 deaths
Dutch women singers
Dutch sopranos
People from Deurne, Netherlands